PHE or Phe may refer to:

Science and technology
 Protocol header encrypt or BitTorrent protocol encryption
 Phenylalanine (symbol: Phe), an amino acid
 Phoenix (constellation) (IAU abbreviation: Phe)

Organisations
 Paramount Home Entertainment, the home video distribution arm of Paramount Pictures
 Public Health England, an executive agency of the Department of Health in the UK
 Physical and Health Education Canada (PHE Canada), a Canadian health organization; See Canada Fitness Award Program

Other uses
 Population, health, and the environment, an approach to development that integrates health or family planning with conservation efforts
 Port Hedland International Airport (IATA code), Australia